Public Understanding of Science is a bimonthly peer-reviewed academic journal established in 1992 and published by SAGE Publications. It covers topics in the popular perception of science, the role of science in society, philosophy of science, science education, and science in public policy. The editor-in-chief is Hans-Peter Peters (Research Center Jülich & Free University of Berlin, Germany).

Abstracting and indexing 
Public Understanding of Science is abstracted and indexed in Scopus and the Social Sciences Citation Index. According to the Journal Citation Reports, its 2019 2-year impact factor is 2.754, ranking it 13 out of 88 journals in the category "Communication" and 2 out of 46 journals in the category "History & Philosophy of Science".

Criticism
Public Understanding of Science has been criticised for its lack of commitment to open access, given that it publishes research about public understanding and access to scientific knowledge. Journal editors have published reasons for their position in the journal. However debate continues even within the journal's editorial team.

Editors
John Durant, 1992-1997
Bruce V. Lewenstein, 1998-2003
Edna F. Einsiedel, 2004-2009
Martin W. Bauer, 2010-2015
Massimiano Bucchi, 2016-2019
Hans-Peter Peters, 2020-present

References

External links
 

Publications established in 1992
Science education journals
SAGE Publishing academic journals
Bimonthly journals
Philosophy journals
English-language journals